Target is a 1995 Hindi drama film directed by Sandip Ray based on the novel Manushar Juddha, written by Prafulla Roy. The film is centred on the relationship between Singh, a cruel,  manipulative landowner and his workers that belong to the caste of pariahs.

Cast
Mohan Agashe - Vindhyachal Singh 
Barun Chakraborty - Chaupatial 
Champa - Bijari
Gyanesh Mukherjee - Rampear 
Om Puri - Rambharosa 
Anjaan Srivastav - Choubey

References

External links 
 

1995 films
1990s Hindi-language films
Films directed by Sandip Ray
1995 drama films
Films with screenplays by Satyajit Ray
1990s Bengali-language films
1996 drama films
1996 films